The 2007 NRW Trophy was held in two parts, with ice dancers competing separately from the singles disciplines and pair skating. Both competitions were held at the Eissportzentrum Westfalenhalle in Dortmund. The ice dancing competition was held between November 2 and November 4, 2007, and the other disciplines were held between November 30 and December 2, 2007. Skaters competed in the disciplines of men's singles, ladies' singles, and ice dancing across the levels of senior, junior, and novice and a novice pairs competition as well. In addition, the ice dancing competition included a pre-novice division.

Senior results

Men

Ladies

Ice dancing

 WD = Withdrawn

External links
 2007 NRW Trophy for Figure Skating
 2007 NRW Trophy for Ice Dancing

NRW Trophy
Nrw Trophy, 2007